Orotko is a freshwater lake in the Sakha Republic (Yakutia), Russia.

Orotko is one of the largest lakes in the Ust-Yansky District. Like most bodies of water in the region it has not been studied enough. There are numerous smaller lakes in its vicinity.

Geography
Orotko lake lies north of the Arctic circle, in the western part of the Yana-Indigirka Lowland. It is located in an area of lakes between the lower course of the Yana and the Chondon. The main outflowing rivers exit the lake from the eastern shore of the lake. To the north the Chubuku flows northeastwards and to the south the Togusta heads eastwards. Both are left tributaries of the Chondon. The lake begins to freeze in mid September and stays under ice until early June.

Fauna
Lake Orotko is rich in fish.

See also
List of lakes of Russia

References

External links
Fishing & Tourism in Yakutia

Lakes of the Sakha Republic
East Siberian Lowland
Drainage basins of the Laptev Sea